Bartomeu Rosselló-Pòrcel (3 August 1913 in Palma, Majorca – 5 January 1938 in El Brull, Barcelona) was a Spanish Balearic poet, who wrote in Catalan.

He completed his bachelor's degree in arts and philosophy in Barcelona and his PhD degree in Madrid. He died of tuberculosis at the age of 24.

Works 
Nou poemes (Nine poems) 1933 
Quadern de sonets (Notebook of sonnets) 1934 
Imitació del foc (Imitation of fire), 1938

External links 

People from Palma de Mallorca
Catalan-language poets
1913 births
1938 deaths
20th-century Spanish poets
20th-century Spanish male writers
20th-century deaths from tuberculosis
Tuberculosis deaths in Spain